Bitzer may refer to:

People with the surname      
 Billy Bitzer, pioneering cinematographer
 Donald Bitzer, co-inventor of plasma display
 Marc Bitzer (born c. 1965), German business executive

Other
 Bitzer SE, one of the leading companies in the area of refrigeration and air conditioning technology
 Bitzer, one of the leading characters of the TV series, Shaun the Sheep